Maya (The Illusion) is a novel by K. Surendran. Maya address how materialism makes society hard.

References

Malayalam novels